Rompicherla is a village in Chittoor district of the Indian state of Andhra Pradesh. It is the mandal headquarters of Rompicherla mandal.

Demographics 

As per Population Census 2011, The Rompicherla village has population of 8679 of which 4280 are males while 4399 are females, with a sex Ratio of 1028 which is higher than Andhra Pradesh's state average of 993. The population of children with age 0-6 is 953, Child Sex Ratio for the village as per census is 895 and literacy rate of the village was 70.26%.

References

Mandal headquarters in Chittoor district
Villages in Chittoor district